The Caranchos of Florida is a 1938 Argentine drama film directed and written by Alberto De Zavalia with Carlos Aden. The film premiered in Buenos Aires and starred José Gola and Amelia Bence.

The film is based on a novel of the same title by Benito Lynch. It was part of the Golden Age of Argentine Cinema.

In the United States release the film was distributed by Cinexport Distributing Co.

Cast
José Gola
Amelia Bence
Domingo Sapelli
Homero Cárpena
Froilán Varela
Herminia Mancini
Isabel Figlioli
Carlos Bellucci
Miguel Ligero
Carlos Fioriti
Néstor Feria

Plot
The film deals with the conflict between a father, master of a cattle ranch, and his son, who has returned after study.

External links

1938 films
Argentine drama films
1930s Spanish-language films
Argentine black-and-white films
1938 drama films
Films directed by Alberto de Zavalía
Films based on Argentine novels
Films set in Argentina
1930s Argentine films